A.P.S. College of Engineering is a private co-educational engineering and management college in Bangalore, India, affiliated with the Visvesvaraya Technological University founded in 1997 by A.P.S. Educational Trust. The college is located in Somanahalli, on Kanakapura road, Bangalore.

Campus

APS College of Engineering has a sprawling campus that covers more than 60 acres of land.

A Digital Library with an excellent infrastructure has been set up at the Library in campus. Students can browse and search all your Databases, E-Journals, E-Books & References in digital library.

The campus has a Hostel for boys, which can house nearly 150 students hailing from different states all over the country.
The campus has a hostel for girls which can accommodate around 50 students.

Courses

The college offers undergraduate programmes leading to 4-5-year Bachelors and 2-3-year master's degree of the Visvesvaraya Technological University in the following streams.

Undergraduate Departments

 Computer Science and Engineering
 Civil Engineering
 Electronics and Communication Engineering
 Information Science and Engineering
 Mechanical Engineering

External links
 Official website
 Karnataka.com

Engineering colleges in Bangalore
Affiliates of Visvesvaraya Technological University
All India Council for Technical Education